Francisco Solano Asta-Buruaga y Cienfuegos (July 21, 1817 – June 13, 1892) was a Chilean politician and lawyer.

Biography 
Astaburuaga was born in Talca on July 21, 1817. His parents were Cayetano Astaburuaga Valdovinos and Petronila Cienfuegos Silva.

He studied in Presbítero Juan de Díaz Romo School and Instituto Nacional. Studied Law in Universidad de San Felipe; and was sworn in as lawyer on September 5, 1832.

Astaburuaga married on June 10, 1853 with María del Rosario Vergara Rencoret.

Works 
 Diccionario Geográfico de la República de Chile; Second Edition. Santiago, Chile; 1899.

References 
 Francisco Solano Astaburuaga Cienfuegos

External links 

1817 births
1892 deaths
People from Talca
Chilean people of Basque descent
Liberal Party (Chile, 1849) politicians
Deputies of the X Legislative Period of the National Congress of Chile
Deputies of the XI Legislative Period of the National Congress of Chile
Deputies of the XII Legislative Period of the National Congress of Chile
Senators of the Constituent Congress of Chile (1891)
19th-century Chilean lawyers
Instituto Nacional General José Miguel Carrera alumni
University of Chile alumni
People of the Chilean Civil War of 1891 (Balmacedistas)